Anil Krish is an Indian film director and editor who works in Tamil cinema.

Career 
After watching the short film Kasappu Inippu directed by Srihari Prabaharan, Aruna Guhan and Aparna Guhan, the great-granddaughters of A. V. Meiyappan selected Srihari along with his friend Anil Krishnan to write a script for  their film, Idhuvum Kadandhu Pogum (2014). The film was released directly on YouTube. Anil Krishnan's short film The Lost Paradise was selected to be a part of the anthology film Bench Talkies (2015).

Filmography

As director 
 Idhuvum Kadandhu Pogum (2014)
 Bench Talkies (2015; segment: The Lost Paradise)

As editor 
 Idhuvum Kadandhu Pogum (2014)
Aviyal (2016)
Penguin (2020)
Kuruthi Aattam (2022)
Ra Ra Rajasekhar (TBA)

References

External links 

Indian film directors
Indian film editors
Year of birth missing (living people)
Living people